The 2008–09 Cypriot Second Division was the 54th season of the Cypriot second-level football league. Ermis won their 3rd title.

Format
Fourteen teams participated in the 2008–09 Cypriot Second Division. All teams played against each other twice, once at their home and once away. The team with the most points at the end of the season crowned champions. The first three teams were promoted to 2009–10 Cypriot First Division and the last three teams were relegated to the 2009–10 Cypriot Third Division.

Changes from previous season
Teams promoted to 2008–09 Cypriot First Division
 AEP Paphos
 APEP
 Atromitos Yeroskipou

Teams relegated from 2007–08 Cypriot First Division
 Aris Limassol
 Nea Salamina
 Olympiakos Nicosia

Teams promoted from 2007–08 Cypriot Third Division
 PAEEK FC
 Ethnikos Assia
 Chalkanoras Idaliou

Teams relegated to 2008–09 Cypriot Third Division
 Anagennisi Deryneia
 Akritas Chlorakas
 Olympos Xylofagou

League standings

Results

Top scorers

Source: cfa.com.cy

See also
 Cypriot Second Division
 2008–09 Cypriot First Division
 2008–09 Cypriot Cup
 2008–09 in Cypriot football

Sources

2. DIVISION 2008–09

Cypriot Second Division seasons
Cyprus
2008–09 in Cypriot football